John McIntyre may refer to:

Sportspeople
 John McIntyre (cricketer) (born 1944), New Zealand cricketer
 John McIntyre (racing driver) (born 1977), New Zealand racing driver
 John McIntyre (hurler) (born 1961), Irish hurling manager
 John McIntyre (ice hockey) (born 1969), Canadian ice hockey player
 John McIntyre (American rower) (born 1928), American rower who competed in the 1948 Summer Olympics
 John McIntyre (Canadian rower) (born 1945), Canadian rower who competed in the 1968 Summer Olympics
 John McIntyre (rugby league), Australian rugby league player

Others
 John McIntyre (archbishop of Birmingham) (1855–1935), Roman Catholic archbishop of Birmingham
 John McIntyre (bishop of Gippsland) (1951-2014), bishop of the Anglican Diocese of Gippsland in Australia
 John McIntyre (cartoonist) (born 1954), American writer, director, and art director
 John McIntyre (copyeditor), American copy editor and blogger
 John McIntyre (politician) (1832–1904), Australian businessman and politician
 John McIntyre (publisher), co-founder of RealClearPolitics
 John McIntyre (theologian) (1916–2005), professor of theology at the University of Edinburgh
 John J. McIntyre (politician) (1904–1974), U.S. Representative from Wyoming
 John J. McIntyre (bishop) (born 1963), American Roman Catholic bishop
 John T. McIntyre (1871–1951), American novelist
 Trapper John McIntyre, character from American TV series M*A*S*H
 John McIntyre (soldier), former US Army soldier who defected to Russia

See also
 John Macintyre (1857–1928), Scottish doctor, pioneer in radiology
 John McIntire (1907–1991), American character actor
 John McIntire (pioneer), founder of the city of Zanesville, Ohio
 Johnny McIntyre (disambiguation)